Michał Kaput (born 18 February 1998) is a Polish professional footballer who plays as a central midfielder for Piast Gliwice.

Honours

Club
Radomiak Radom
I liga: 2020–21
II liga: 2018–19

References

External links

1998 births
Living people
Polish footballers
Polonia Warsaw players
Radomiak Radom players
Piast Gliwice players
Ekstraklasa players
I liga players
II liga players
Association football midfielders
People from Wyszków
ŁKS Łomża players